Abdel Amid Boutefnouchet (born 15 January 1932) is a French boxer. He competed in the men's flyweight event at the 1952 Summer Olympics. At the 1952 Summer Olympics, he lost to Dai Dower of Great Britain.

References

1932 births
Living people
French male boxers
Olympic boxers of France
Boxers at the 1952 Summer Olympics
Place of birth missing (living people)
Flyweight boxers